The 4th season of Taniec z Gwiazdami, the Polish edition of Dancing With the Stars, started on 10 September 2006 and ended on 12 November 2006. It was broadcast by TVN. Katarzyna Skrzynecka and Hubert Urbański continued as the hosts, and the judges were: Iwona Szymańska-Pavlović, Zbigniew Wodecki, Beata Tyszkiewicz and Piotr Galiński.

Couples

Scores

Red numbers indicate the lowest score for each week.
Green numbers indicate the highest score for each week.
 indicates the couple eliminated that week.
 indicates the returning couple that finished in the bottom two.
 indicates the winning couple of the week.
 indicates the runner-up of the week.

Notes:

Week 1: Maria Wałęsa and Peter J. Lucas scored 32 out of 40 on their first dance (Waltz), making it the highest score in this episode. Michał Milowicz got 22 points for his Cha-cha-cha, making it the lowest score of the week and this season. There was no elimination this week.

Week 2: Peter J. Lucas and Przemysław Cypryjański scored 36 out of 40 on their second dance. It was the highest score ever in Week 2. Klaudia Carlos, Witold Paszt, Katarzyna Cichopek and Małgorzata Foremniak also got 36 points for their 2nd dance. Maria Wałęsa got 26 points for her Rumba, making it the lowest score of the week. Michał & Izabela were eliminated despite being 2 points from the bottom.

Week 3: Joanna Liszowska and Peter J. Lucas scored 36 out of 40 on their third dance. It was the highest score ever in Week 2. Klaudia Carlos, Małgorzata Foremniak and Katarzyna Cichopek also got 36 points for their 3rd dance in Week 3. Kaja Paschalska got 26 points for her Tango, making it the lowest score of the week. Kaja & Piotr were eliminated.

Week 4: Kinga Rusin scored 36 out of 40 on her 4th dance (Paso Doble), making it the highest score in this episode. Marcin Mroczek got 27 points for his Foxtrot, making it the lowest score of the week. Magdalena & Robert were eliminated despite being 6 points from the bottom.

Week 5: Przemysław Sadowski received his first perfect score for the Jive. Joanna Liszowska and Maria Wałęsa got 30 points for their Jive, making it the lowest score of the week. Maria & Paweł were eliminated.

Week 6: All couples danced to polish songs. Przemysław Sadowski received his second perfect score for the Quickstep. Peter J. Lucas got 30 points for his Quickstep, making it the lowest score of the week. Przemysław & Aneta were eliminated despite being 3 points from the bottom.

Week 7: All couples danced to the most famous songs of Elvis Presley. Joanna Liszowska and Przemysław Sadowski scored 38 out of 40 on their 7th dance, making it the highest score in this episode. Marcin Mroczek got 32 points for his Tango, making it the lowest score of the week. Joanna & Robert were eliminated despite being 6 points from the bottom.

Week 8: All couples danced to rock songs. Kinga Rusin received her first perfect score for the Rumba. Marcin Mroczek and Peter J. Lucas got 70 out of 80 points, making it the lowest score of the week. Przemysław & Ewa were eliminated despite being 5 points from the bottom.

Week 9: All couples danced to classic songs. Peter J. Lucas scored 39 out of 40, making it the highest score in this episode. Marcin & Edyta were eliminated.

Week 10: Kinga Rusin received her second perfect score for the Freestyle. Both Kinga Rusin and Peter J. Lucas got 113 out of 120 points. It was the first time the finalist didn't score 40 points for the Freestyle. Kinga Rusin became the 4th winner in the history of the show. This is the first time the season's winner was on the third place on the judges' general scoreboard and the first time the winner was not on the first place according to the judges' scoreboard.

Special Star

Average Chart

Average Dance Chart

Highest and lowest scoring performances
The best and worst performances in each dance according to the judges' marks are as follows:

The Best Score (40)

Episodes
Individual judges scores in charts below (given in parentheses) are listed in this order from left to right: Ivona Pavlović, Zbigniew Wodecki, Beata Tyszkiewicz, Piotr Galiński.

Week 1
Running order

Week 2
Running order

Week 3
Running order

Week 4
Running order

Week 5: Jive Week
Running order

Week 6: Polish Week
Running order

Week 7: Elvis Presley Week
Running order

Week 8: Rock Week
Running order

Week 9: Classical Music Week
Running order

Week 10: Final
Running order

Other Dances

Dance Schedule
The celebrities and professional partners danced one of these routines for each corresponding week.
 Week 1: Cha-Cha-Cha or Waltz
 Week 2: Rumba or Quickstep
 Week 3: Samba or Tango
 Week 4: Paso Doble or Foxtrot
 Week 5: Jive
 Week 6: One unlearned dance (Polish Week)
 Week 7: One unlearned dance & Group Viennese Waltz (Elvis Presley Week)
 Week 8: One unlearned dance & one repeated dance (Rock Music Week)
 Week 9: One unlearned dance & one repeated dance (Classic Music Week)
 Week 10: Favorite Latin dance, favorite Ballroom dance & Freestyle

Dances Chart

 Highest scoring dance
 Lowest scoring dance
 Performed, but not scored

Episode results

 This couple came in first place with the judges.
 This couple came in first place with the judges and gained the highest number of viewers' votes.
 This couple gained the highest number of viewers' votes.
 This couple came in first place with the judges and was eliminated.
 This couple came in last place with the judges and gained the highest number of viewers' votes.
 This couple came in last place with the judges.
 This couple came in last place with the judges and was eliminated.
 This couple was eliminated.
 This couple won the competition.
 This couple came in second in the competition.
 This couple came in third in the competition.

Audience voting results

Rating Figures

External links
 Official Site - Taniec z gwiazdami
 Taniec z gwiazdami on Polish Wikipedia

Season 04
2006 Polish television seasons